"Save Me" is a song written and recorded by Belgian-Australian singer-songwriter Gotye. The song was released in Australia by Eleven Music on 13 August 2012 as the fifth single from his third studio album, Making Mirrors (2011), a year after the release of his signature song "Somebody That I Used to Know".

Background
Like most of the tracks from Gotye's album, he wrote and recorded the song in a barn on his parents' block of land in the Mornington Peninsula near his hometown, Melbourne in Victoria. The song is lyrically based on Gotye's depression, and the aid that his girlfriend, Tash Parker, brings, which some other tracks also use as subject matter.

Music video
A music video to accompany the release of "Save Me" was first released onto YouTube on 8 August 2012 at a total length of three minutes and fifty-four seconds. The video was directed and animated by Peter Lowey.

Track listing

Chart performance

Release history

References

External links
{https://www.youtube.com/watch?v=O4_lBT1OG_Y} YouTube

2011 songs
2012 singles
Gotye songs
Pop ballads
Rock ballads
Songs about depression
Songs about suicide
Songs written by Gotye
Eleven: A Music Company singles
Animated music videos